Andhra Loyola Institute of Engineering and Technology (ALIET or locally "Loyola Engineering College") is a sister – institution of the reputable Andhra Loyola College, Vijayawada.

References

External links
 Official website

Jesuit universities and colleges in India
Education in Vijayawada
Educational institutions established in 2008
2008 establishments in Andhra Pradesh
Science and technology in Vijayawada
Engineering colleges in Vijayawada
Engineering colleges in Krishna district
Engineering colleges in Andhra Pradesh
Engineering universities and colleges in India